The 1998–99 Drexel Dragons men's basketball team represented Drexel University  during the 1998–99 NCAA Division I men's basketball season. The Dragons, led by 8th year head coach Bill Herrion, played their home games at the Daskalakis Athletic Center and were members of the America East Conference (AEC).

The team finished the season 20–9, and finished in 1st place in the AEC in the regular season.

Roster

Schedule

|-
!colspan=9 style="background:#F8B800; color:#002663;"| Regular season
|-

|-
!colspan=9 style="background:#F5CF47; color:#002663;"| AEC tournament

Awards
 Bill Herrion
America East Conference Coach of the Year

Bryant Coursey
AEC All-Championship Team
AEC Player of the Week

Mike DeRocckis
AEC All-Conference Second Team

Mike Kouser
AEC All-Conference Second Team

Joe Linderman
AEC All-Conference First Team
AEC All-Championship Team

References

Drexel Dragons men's basketball seasons
Drexel
1998 in sports in Pennsylvania
1999 in sports in Pennsylvania